The Kingston Independent Residents Group (KIRG) is a political party in the United Kingdom. The party was launched in 2017 and formed from a number of residents groups in the area of Kingston upon Thames. They received a significant boost shortly after their formation when sitting councillors Mary Clark and David Fraser defected from the Conservative Party. The party promotes a localist agenda that seeks to give residents, towns and parishes a greater say in the future of their town. They currently have 2 seats on the Kingston upon Thames council and form part of the opposition.

Electoral history
Kingston Independent Residents Group fought their first local elections in May 2018, with 15 candidates standing for seats in the Kingston upon Thames London Borough Council. They did not win any seats.

They fielded 19 candidates in the 2022 local elections for seats on Kingston Council, receiving 5% of the vote and winning a seat in Green Lane & St James Ward.

On 10th November 2022, they won their second seat on Kingston Council, gaining the second seat of the Green Lane & St James Ward from the Liberal Democrats via a by-election.

References

External links

Epsom & Ewell Residents Associations
Independents for Frome

Local government in London
Locally based political parties in England
Political parties established in 2017